Baldslow is a suburb in the north of Hastings, East Sussex, England. It is sometimes considered part of Conquest as Bohemia and Silverhill.

The area lies on the A21 and the Hastings ring road, and the A28 road junction with the A21. Ore and Central Conquest is to the East, and Ashdown and Hollington are to the West.

History 
The name Baldslow means "Beald’s Hill".

References 

Suburbs of Hastings